The Battle of Xuzhou was a military conflict between the Empire of Japan and the Republic of China forces in May 1938 during the Second Sino-Japanese War.

History
In 1937 the North China Area Army had chased Song Zheyuan's 29th Army to the south along the Jinpu Railway (see Tianjin–Pukou Railway Operation) after his defeat in the Battle of Lugou Bridge. After Japan won the Battle of Nanjing, the North China Area Army advanced southward to establish a Japanese connection between Beijing and Nanjing, ignoring the non-expansionist policy of the Imperial General Headquarters in Tokyo. Most mechanized and air forces in eastern China were wiped out in the Battle of Shanghai, which concluded in late November 1937. Although new equipment was purchased, it had yet to be shipped. Han Fuqu, the chairman of the Shandong province, rejected orders from Chiang Kai-shek and kept retreating to preserve his force. After Qingdao was occupied in January 1938, Han's policy was denounced and he was executed on 24 January. In March 1938 Japanese forces occupied the north of Shandong, including the capital city Jinan. The defense line along the Yellow River was torn apart. Due to pressure from Japanese forces, 64 Chinese divisions gathered around Xuzhou in Jiangsu, the headquarters of 5th Military Region of the National Revolutionary Army. Without surrounding it, Gen. Itagaki Seishiro moved south first to attack Tai'erzhuang, where he was defeated by Li Zongren in a regional asymmetric battle.

Following this defeat, Japan intended an encirclement against Xuzhou and deployed the North China Area Army to the north and the Central China Expeditionary Army to the south. The North China Area Army had four divisions and two infantry brigades drawn from the Kwantung Army. Central China Expeditionary Army had three divisions and the 1st and 2nd Tank Battalions with motorized support units formed into the Iwanaka and Imada Detachments, which were ordered to advance to the west of Xuzhou to cut off and  prevent Chinese forces from withdrawing towards the west. The 5th Tank Battalion was used to support the 3rd Infantry Division advancing north along the railway to Xuzhou. Additional troops were deployed in the Battle of Northern and Eastern Henan by the North China Area Army to stop Chinese reinforcements from the west. A Chinese counterattack here resulted in the Battle of Lanfeng. However, with the approach of the Central China Expeditionary Army from the south, the overall situation was grim, and Chiang Kai-shek ordered the withdrawal of the armies. The demolition of the dykes holding back the Yellow River allowed him more time for the preparation of the defense of Wuhan, but the resulting 1938 Yellow River flood also destroyed much of the area around the new course of the river and claimed appalling losses among chinese civilians: est. 400,000–500,000 dead and 3 million refugees.

The Japanese army won the fierce battle and ultimately captured Xuzhou, but Japanese forces were too small to contain the large number of encircled Chinese troops. Most of the Chinese soldiers broke through the encirclement through gaps in the Japanese lines to the west or dispersed into the countryside as guerrillas. By successfully breaking out of the Japanese encirclement, the Chinese were able to preserve most of their forces. These units would form approximately 50% of the Chinese forces participating in the Defense of Wuhan.

See also
Order of battle: Battle of Xuzhou
Chinese order of battle, Battle of Xuzhou
Huaihai Campaign

Notes

Xuzhou
Xuzhou
1938 in China
1938 in Japan
Military history of Jiangsu
March 1938 events
April 1938 events
May 1938 events